Thiruparankundram, also spelled Tirupparankundram or Tiruparangundram, is a neighbourhood in Madurai city in Tamil Nadu, India. It is a home to many ancient and historic monuments including Jain caves, some protected as India's national monuments.

As of 2011, the town had a population of 48,810. It was incorporated into a new township in 2011, and the first local body election for the corporation was held on 18 October 2011.

History and significance
Thiruparankundram and its landmark hill contains some of the earliest cave temples of Shaivism tradition in this region. The hill is sacred to the Hindus. They call it Skandamalai (lit. "hill of Skanda (Murugan, Kartikeya) – the god of war"). One of the early Shaivism-tradition cave temple at the northern foot of the hill was greatly expanded in stages with mandapas and additional shrines over the 7th- to 15th-century by various Hindu dynasties, to include a feeding house, a Vedic school and for traditional performance arts. This is now a major temple complex known as the Thirupparamkunram Murugan temple. It is one of the Six Abodes of Murugan, a major pilgrimage site. It is among the most visited tourist places in Madurai, next only to the Meenakshi Amman Temple.

The western edge of the Thiruparankundram hill is home to ancient Jain beds with Tamil Brahmi inscriptions dated between 2nd century BCE and 2nd century CE. Uphill, the hills has several other Jain bas-reliefs of Parsvanatha and Mahavira with inscriptions, dated to about 8th to 9th-century. The traditional name of these Jain beds is "Pancha Pandava" beds, reflecting the local historic belief that the beds were one of the places where the five brothers of the Mahabharata fame rested. The southern side  of the hill has a natural spring called Saraswati Tirtha as well as another Thirupparankundram rock-cut cave temple that some have proposed was an ancient Jain temple converted into Shaiva temple in the 7th-century and expanded in the 13th-century. Some Hindu pilgrims circumambulate around the entire Thiruparankundram hill given the many religious monuments and history here.

A steady flight of stone stairs and walkway from the north end, as well as another from the south end, lead to the top of the hill on the western side where there is another rock-cut pre-9th century Kasi Viswanathar temple – named after the one in Varanasi – with a natural water tank and an overview of the rural scenery around Madurai. The stone walkway is marked and has Torana-like gateways along the way. Covered mandapa (choultry) are found along the hike. Some caverns feature Jain Tirthankara images along the way, confirming the hills importance to Jainism. The cave temple at the top is a Hindu temple dedicated to Shiva with a few inscriptions.

Thiruparankundram–Madurai area was the target of extensive destruction and lootings by the Delhi Sultanate in the 14th-century, followed by an attempt to establish an Islamic Sultanate in Tamil Nadu. Known as the Madurai Sultanate, this was short lived and the last Sultan of the Sultanate – Sikandar Shah – along with his generals were killed in Thiruparankundram by the Vijayanagara Empire forces in 1377 CE. The Vijayanagara rulers allowed the Muslim community to build a graveyard memorial for Sikandar Shah in late 14th to early 15th-century on the top of the Tirupparaṅkuṉdṟam hill on the northeastern side. This grave memorial was expanded into a Dargah (mosque) for Muslim pilgrimage, during the 17th and 18th-century. This monument is called the Tirupparankunram Dargah, and the Muslim community calls the same hill as "Sikandarmalai".

In the 18th-century and after, the Murugan temple's mandapas and infrastructure were used as civic hospital by Hindus and as a second outpost of Madurai where soldiers gathered during times of war. Later, the European regiments aided by Haider Ali and Yusuf Khan targeted controlling the temple during the British and French campaign to form what later became the Madras Presidency.

Demographics

According to 2011 census, Thiruparankundram had a population of 48,810 with a sex-ratio of 999 females for every 1,000 males, much above the national average of 929. A total of 4,736 were under the age of six, constituting 2,455 males and 2,281 females. Scheduled Castes and Scheduled Tribes accounted for 7.44% and 0.66% of the population, respectively. The average literacy of the town was 79.55%, compared to the national average of 72.99%. The town had a total of  12934 households. There were a total of 18,480 workers, comprising 109 cultivators, 386 main agricultural labourers, 516 in house hold industries, 15,926 other workers, 1,543 marginal workers, 47 marginal cultivators, 69 marginal agricultural labourers, 228 marginal workers in household industries and 1,199 other marginal workers.

As per the religious census of 2011, Thiruparankundram had 91.79% Hindus, 3.62% Muslims, 4.46% Christians, 0.01% Sikhs, and  0.11% following other religions.

Transport
There is a bus stand with bus services connecting Thirupparangkundram with other parts of Madurai and adjacent villages.

Important places
 The temple of lord Muruga one of the oldest temples built in sixth century is here.
 The mausoleum of Sulthan Sikandar Shah Thiruparankundram Dargah is at the top of Thirupprankundram hills.

See also
 Muthupatti
 Thirupparamkunram Murugan Temple
 Thiruparankundram Dargah

References

 
Neighbourhoods and suburbs of Madurai